Thomas J. Quigley is a politician from Pennsylvania. He represented the 146th Legislative District in Pennsylvania House of Representatives for four terms.

Career 
Quigley was elected mayor of Royersford in 2001. He was a Royersford Borough Councilman from 1999 to 2001.  Shortly before his tenure as a state representative, Quigley worked as a project leader for an investment firm.

Pennsylvania House of Representatives 
Quigley was elected to the Pennsylvania House of Representatives to represent the 146th district in 2004. He served on the House Education, Finance and Liquor Control Committees. Quigley lost the seat to Democratic opponent Mark Painter in 2012. Quigley would return to the House when he defeated Painter at the November 4, 2014 election and seated on December 1, 2014. Quigley was defeated for reelection by Democratic opponent Joe Ciresi in 2018.

Personal
Quigley earned his bachelor's degree in Business Management from Philadelphia University in 1986 and his Master of Business Administration from Philadelphia University in 1993.

He resides in Royersford.

References

Thomas Jefferson University alumni
Mayors of places in Pennsylvania
Republican Party members of the Pennsylvania House of Representatives
Living people
People from Montgomery County, Pennsylvania
21st-century American politicians
1961 births